Jordan Hughes (born April 23, 1984) is a Canadian soccer player who currently plays for Victoria Highlanders in the USL Premier Development League.

Career

College
Hughes played college soccer with Coastal Carolina University, where he was a member of the Big South All Tournament Team. He scored 7 goals in the Big South Conference, allowing Coastal Carolina to win the Big South Championship Game, and was also named Big South Player of the Week twice his senior year.

Hughes also played with the British Columbia Provincial Team from 1998 to 2001.

Professional
In 2006 Charleston Battery selected Hughes in the first round pick in the USL Draft Pick, and signed a contract with the team. He made his Battery debut on July 4 against Miami FC. In his first season, he played ten games and recorded an assist. He helped Charleston make the playoffs reaching all the way to the semi-finals. He signed a new year deal with Charleston in 2007.

On December 7, 2008 Hughes was named as one of the "original six" players to play for the expansion Victoria Highlanders in the USL Premier Development League in 2009.

External links
Victoria Highlanders profile
Charleston Battery profile
Coastal Carolina University profile

References

1984 births
Living people
Canadian expatriate sportspeople in the United States
Canadian expatriate soccer players
Canadian soccer players
Canadian people of Welsh descent
Charleston Battery players
Expatriate soccer players in the United States
Association football forwards
Soccer players from Victoria, British Columbia
USL First Division players
USL League Two players
Victoria Highlanders players
Canada men's youth international soccer players
Coastal Carolina Chanticleers men's soccer players